Antoine Rizkallah "Tony" Kanaan Filho (born 31 December 1974), nicknamed TK, is a Brazilian racing driver. He competes full-time in the Brazilian Stock Car Pro Series, driving the No. 6 Toyota Corolla E210 for Full Time Bassani and part-time for Arrow McLaren SP, driving the No. 66 Dallara Chevrolet for the 2023 IndyCar Series season.

Kanaan won the 2013 Indianapolis 500 and the 2004 IndyCar Series championship. In that season, he completed 3,305 laps, becoming the first IndyCar Series driver to complete every possible lap in a season. He also led 889 laps in 13 separate races to establish an IndyCar Series record. He is also the only driver to lead the Indianapolis 500 in each of his first seven starts and won his first race on his 12th attempt. Kanaan has a total of 17 career race wins and 15 pole positions in the IndyCar Series. Kanaan also won the 24 Hours of Daytona in 2015, driving for Chip Ganassi Racing.

Kanaan drove the No. 14  Dallara Chevrolet for A. J. Foyt Racing from 2018 to 2020.

Early racing career

Formula car racing

Formula Europa Boxer
Kanaan would begin to compete in Formula Europa Boxer for the 1994 season. Kanaan would drive for Cram Competition in a Tatuus-Alfa Romeo. Kanaan would win the series championship on the strength of 5 wins.

Italian Formula Three
Kanaan competed in Italian Formula Three in 1995 for Tatuus in a Dallara 395-Opel. Kanaan would win a race and get 9 podiums to finish 5th in points with 111 points.

Indy Lights Series
Kanaan began to compete in the PPG/Firestone Indy Lights Championship Powered By Buick (now Indy Lights presented by Cooper Tires) in 1996 for Tasman Motorsports in the No. 37 Marlboro Lola T96/20-Buick V6. At the season-opening race at Homestead Motorsports Complex Kanaan started 9th and finished 10th. At the second race of the season on the Streets of Long Beach, Kanaan would start 3rd and finish 2nd. Kanaan moved from 10th to 3rd in points following the race. Kanaan's results in the next three races were 12th, 17th, and 7th at Nazareth Speedway, Michigan International Speedway and the Milwaukee Mile. In those races, Kanaan started 14th, 4th, and 11th. At Michigan Kanaan led for 8 laps before retiring due to a mechanical problem. At the race at Belle Isle State Park Kanaan started 5th and won his first race after leading for a race-high 29 of 36 laps. At the next race at Portland International Raceway Kanaan qualified on the pole position and finished 5th after leading for 3 laps. Kanaan would get a pair of 2nd-place finishes at the races at Circuit Trois-Rivières and Concord Pacific Place. In the latter, Kanaan led for a race-high 22 of 44 laps. At the next and season-ending race at Laguna Seca Raceway Kanaan qualified on the pole position and led for all 34 laps to get his second victory of the season. Kanaan would finish 2nd in points with 113 points.

In 1997 Kanaan returned with Tasman Motorsports to drive the No. 7 Marlboro/Davene/Brahma Lola T97/20-Buick V6. At the season-opening race at Homestead Motorsports Complex Kanaan started 10th and finished 6th. Kanaan would then get consecutive 5th-place finishes at the next two races, on the Streets of Long Beach and at Nazareth Speedway. Kanaan would then finish 23rd and 10th at the Hutchinson Island Road Race Course and at Gateway International Raceway. At the next race at Belle Isle State Park Kanaan qualified on the pole position and led all 36 laps of the race to win the race. Kanaan would then qualify on the pole position at Exhibition Place and would finish in 2nd place. Kanaan would then win at Circuit Trois-Rivières after starting 3rd and leading for a race-high 44 of 50 laps. Kanaan would then take the championship lead with a 2nd-place finish at the race at Concord Pacific Place. Kanaan would then finish 2nd and 9th at the races at Laguna Seca Raceway and California Speedway, qualifying on the pole position and 3rd place to end the season. Kanaan would win the series championship with 156 points.

IndyCar racing

Champ Car World Series
Kanaan began to compete in the Champ Car Championship Series in 1998 for Tasman Motorsports in the No. 31 LCI International Reynard 98i-Honda HRK. Kanaan made his debut at the season-opening Marlboro Grand Prix of Miami Presented by Toyota at Homestead Motorsports Complex. In the race, Kanaan started in 18th place and finished in 29th (last) place due to a crash after 29 laps. Kanaan later achieved a pair of third-place finishes at the Honda Grand Prix of Monterey at Laguna Seca Raceway and the Texaco Grand Prix of Houston on the Streets of Houston. Kanaan finished out the season ranked in ninth place in points with 92 points. Kanaan also won the Jim Trueman Rookie of the Year Award.

In 1999, Kanaan began to drive the No. 44 McDonald's Reynard 99i-Honda HRS for Forsythe Racing in conjunction with Tasman Motorsports. Kanaan qualified on the pole position at the Toyota Grand Prix of Long Beach on the Streets of Long Beach. In the race, Kanaan led the first 44 laps and was attempting to hold off Juan Pablo Montoya when he crashed in turn-6. Kanaan later won the U. S. 500 Presented by Toyota at Michigan International Speedway when leader Max Papis ran out of fuel on the last lap. Kanaan's next best finish during the season was fifth place at the Grand Prix Telemar Rio 200 at Emerson Fittipaldi Speedway. Kanaan finished out the season ranked in 11th place in points with 85 points.

For 2000, Kanaan began to drive for Mo Nunn Racing in the No. 55 Hollywood Cigarettes Reyanard 2Ki-Ilmor-Mercedes-Benz IC108F. The season was a struggle for Kanaan as he could only get a best finish of a trio of eighth-place finishes at the Bosch Spark Plug Grand Prix Presented by Toyota at Nazareth Speedway, the Motorola 220 at Road America and the Honda Indy 300 on the Surfers Paradise Street Circuit. At the Tenneco Automotive Grand Prix of Detroit at Belle Isle State Park, Kanaan was injured before the race and missed the race and the three races following it. Kanaan's best start of the season was a third-place at the Target Grand Prix Presented by Energizer at Chicago Motor Speedway. Kanaan finished the season ranked in 19th place in points with 24 points.

In 2001, Kanaan returned with Mo Nunn Racing to drive the No. 55 Hollywood Cigarettes Reynard 01i-Honda HR-1. Kanaan got his first podium since winning at Michigan in 1999 when he got a third-place finish at the Firestone Firehawk 500 at Twin Ring Motegi. Kanaan later qualified on the pole position at the Target Grand Prix Presented by Energizer at Chicago Motor Speedway. Kanaan finished in ninth place in points with 93 points.

Kanaan returned with Mo Nunn Racing in 2002 to originally drive the No. 10 Pioneer Corporation/WorldCom Reynard 02i-Honda HR-2. Kanaan's highlight of the first three races of the season was a second-place start at the Bridgestone Potenza 500 at Twin Ring Motegi. Kanaan's best finish in these races was a 15th-place finish at Motegi. Following Motegi, at the Miller Lite 250 at the Milwaukee Mile, Kanaan switched chassis types to a Lola B02/00. Kanaan qualified on the pole position at both the Grand Prix Americas at Bayfront Park and The 500 Presented by Toyota at California Speedway and finished in third place at both the Molson Indy Vancouver on the Streets of Vancouver and the Molson Indy Montreal at Circuit Gilles Villeneuve. Kanaan finished in 12th place in points with 99 points.

IndyCar Series
Kanaan competed in the Indy Racing League in 2002 for Mo Nunn Racing in the No. 17 Hollywood Cigarettes-sponsored G-Force GF05-Chevrolet V8 in one-off race at the Indianapolis 500. Kanaan was the highest-starting rookie in the race with a fifth-place starting position. In the race, Kanaan led for 23 laps when on lap 90 both Jimmy Vasser and Bruno Junqueira had mechanical problems and slowed on the course. An oil leak was on the track and was not caught by Indy Racing League officials and Kanaan crashed, finishing 28th. Kanaan finished 50th in points with two points.

In 2003, Kanaan drove for Andretti Green Racing in the No. 11 7-Eleven-sponsored Dallara IR03-Ilmor-Honda Indy V8 HI3R. Kanaan got consecutive pole positions at the Toyota Indy 300 at Homestead-Miami Speedway, finishing fourth, and the Purex Dial Indy 200 at Phoenix International Raceway, where he would go on to win his second Indy car race after leading for 79 laps. Kanaan then led the point standings after Phoenix. At the Indy Japan 300 at Twin Ring Motegi Kanaan was involved in a crash with Scott Dixon on lap 178 and finished 14th. There was a question whether Kanaan would be able to compete in the Indianapolis 500. Kanaan was able to participate and qualified 2nd and led for two laps, eventually finishing 3rd behind countrymen and Marlboro Team Penske teammates Gil de Ferran and Hélio Castroneves. Kanaan regained the points lead and held on for the next eight races, except for the Belterra Casino Indy 300 at Kentucky Speedway where he dropped to second place, based on consistent finishes. Following an 18th-place finish at the Firestone Indy 225 at Nazareth Speedway Kanaan dropped to 3rd in points. Kanaan entered the season-ending Chevy 500 at Texas Motor Speedway third in points and was involved in a five-way battle for the championship with de Ferran, Dixon, Castroneves, and Sam Hornish Jr. In the race, Kanaan started ninth and led for 52 laps, only to finish two laps down in 14th place. Kanaan finished fourth in points behind Dixon, de Ferran, and Castroneves with 476 points.

In 2004 Kanaan returned with Andretti Green Racing to drive the No. 11 7-Eleven Dallara IR03-Ilmor-Honda Indy V8 HI4R. At the season-opening Toyota Indy 300 at Homestead-Miami Speedway, Kanaan started and finished eighth. At the second race of the season, the Copper World Indy 200 at Phoenix International Raceway, Kanaan started second and led for 191 of 200 laps to win. Kanaan also took the points lead. At the Indianapolis 500, Kanaan qualified in fifth-place. In the race, Kanaan led for 28 laps and was battling with teammate and friend Dan Wheldon and Buddy Rice. Kanaan was running second to Rice on lap 174 when the caution came out for rain. The race was then stopped permanently on lap 180 with Kanaan in third. Kanaan went on to win both the Bombardier 500 at Texas Motor Speedway and the Firestone Indy 200 at Nashville Superspeedway. Kanaan also qualified on the pole position at the Michigan Indy 400 at Michigan International Speedway and the Honda Indy 225 at Pikes Peak International Raceway. Kanaan clinched the championship with a 2nd-place finish at the Toyota Indy 400 at California Speedway. Kanaan completed all 3,305 laps during the season. Kanaan scored 618 points to win the championship.

For 2005, Kanaan returned with Andretti Green Racing in the No. 11 7-Eleven-sponsored Dallara IR05-Ilmor-Honda Indy V8 HI4R. Kanaan started off the season with a third-place finish at the season-opening Toyota Indy 300 at Homestead-Miami Speedway. At the Indianapolis 500, Kanaan qualified on the pole position. In the race, Kanaan battled early with Sam Hornish Jr. for the lead. Kanaan led for 54 laps, only to drop to an eighth-place finish in the final 50 laps of the race. Kanaan later won the Argent Mortgage Indy 300 at Kansas Speedway and the Argent Mortgage Indy Grand Prix at Infineon Raceway. Kanaan finished second in the point standings behind his teammate and friend Dan Wheldon with 548 points. In September 2005 Kanaan tested a BAR-Honda Formula One car for British American Racing at Circuito de Jerez as a reward for winning the 2004 IndyCar Series championship in a Honda-powered car.

Kanaan returned with Andretti Green Racing in the No. 11 7-Eleven-sponsored Dallara IR05-Ilmor-Honda Indy V8 HI4R in 2006. The entire season would be a struggle for the entire Andretti Green team compared to previous seasons due to in part Marlboro Team Penske and Target Chip Ganassi Racing beginning to use Honda engines due to Toyota withdrawing after 2005. Kanaan's only win of the season was at the ABC Supply Company A. J. Foyt 225 at the Milwaukee Mile. Kanaan's best start of the season was a second at the Watkins Glen Indy Grand Prix presented by Tissot at Watkins Glen International. At the Indianapolis 500, Kanaan qualified fifth and in the race led for 12 laps. On lap 190 Felipe Giaffone crashed in turn 2 while Kanaan still had to make his final pit stop; as a result, he pitted under caution and dropped to fourth place. On the final lap of the race, Dan Wheldon passed Kanaan. Kanaan finished in fifth-place behind Sam Hornish Jr., Marco Andretti, Michael Andretti and Wheldon. On 28 May 2006, Kanaan's friend Rubens Barrichello wore Kanaan's helmet livery during the Formula One Monaco Grand Prix and Kanaan wore Barrichello's helmet during the Indianapolis 500. The two of them created a charity offering financial and technical aid to institutions within the voluntary sector, the Barrichello Kanaan Institute. Kanaan would have an issue with another of his long-time good friends and a former teammate from his time at Tasman Motorsports, Hélio Castroneves. Kanaan and Castroneves had developed an intense rivalry that has resulted in some hard feelings.  Castroneves accused Kanaan of costing him the 2006 series championship by racing him too hard for position in the final race.  Kanaan countered that he was not paid to let other people pass him for the position.  The two started to patch up their differences at 2007 Indianapolis 500. Kanaan finished 6th in points 384 points.

Kanaan had his best season during 2007 (based on wins) in the No. 11 7-Eleven-sponsored Dallara IR5-Honda Indy V8 HI7R for Andretti Green Racing. Kanaan won his first race of the season at the Indy Japan 300 at Twin Ring Motegi. At the following race, the Kansas Lottery Indy 300 at Kansas Speedway Kanaan qualified on the pole position and dueled with eventual winner Dan Wheldon until Kanaan made contact with teammate Danica Patrick in the pit lane (Kanaan was leaving his pit stall as Patrick was entering hers just in front of Kanaan's). Kanaan finished 15th, eight laps down. At the Indianapolis 500 Kanaan won the Scott Brayton Award for showing the spirit of the late Scott Brayton, who was killed while practicing for the 1996 Indianapolis 500. Kanaan qualified 2nd and in the race, he led for a race-high 83 laps. On lap 113, while under caution for a crash by Phil Giebler, the race was stopped due to rain and it began to look as if Kanaan would be declared the winner. Shortly after 6:00 p.m. the race was resumed. On lap 151 Marty Roth brought out the caution for a crash and it was becoming apparent to several teams that rain was coming and the race would end soon. Kanaan and several other cars made pit stops (mainly for tires) while several other cars that had been contending for the win, such as teammate Dario Franchitti and Scott Dixon, along with several drivers who had not been running as competitively, such as Jacques Lazier. This meant that several cars, with differences in tires and also in competitiveness, would be battling with what was expected to be only a handful of laps left. On a lap 156 restart, Kanaan came up on the back of Lazier and caused him to crash in turn 4 and Kanaan to spin into the pit lane with a blown tire. On lap 163 Andretti and Wheldon made contact on the back straightaway and brought out another caution. During the caution on lap 166, the race was permanently stopped for rain with teammate and friend Franchitti winning. Kanaan was then often referred to, along with his team owner Michael Andretti, as one of the best drivers never to win the Indianapolis 500. Kanaan rebounded to win the following race, the ABC Supply Company A. J. Foyt 225 at the Milwaukee Mile, after leading for 25 laps. Kanaan won again at the Firestone Indy 400 at Michigan International Speedway after Kanaan's friends Franchitti and Wheldon crashed on the back straightaway while battling for the lead on lap 144, causing Franchitti to flip and take out several other cars racing in the lead pack such as Scott Dixon, Sam Hornish Jr., A. J. Foyt IV, Tomas Scheckter and Ed Carpenter. Kanaan then dominated the following race, the Meijer Indy 300 at Kentucky Speedway, as he qualified on the pole position and led 131 of 200 laps on his way to victory. Ironically after the race, Franchitti flipped over another time due to hitting the rear end of Kosuke Matsuura's car as he crossed the finish line to complete the race (Franchitti later said that he didn't realize that the race had ended). Kanaan got his fifth win of the season at the Detroit Indy Grand Prix presented by Firestone at Belle Isle State Park. Kanaan infamously got into a heated exchange with Hornish following the Camping World Watkins Glen Grand Prix at Watkins Glen International when during the race the two made contact and as the cars were heading to pit lane Kanaan drove into Hornish's car. Hornish then came over to Kanaan's car when Hornish's father, Sam Hornish, Sr., attempted to get Hornish and Kanaan separated and also shoved Kanaan when an unknown person (some sources claim that the man was a friend of Kanaan's then-car owner Michael Andretti) came to the elder Hornish and shoved him to the ground. By this point crew members from both Team Penske (Hornish's team) and Andretti Green Racing along with Indy Racing League officials and/or safety crew members were trying to break up the fight. Michael Andretti also entered the fight, but was held back by his son and Kanaan's teammate Marco Andretti. Jaime Camara (an Indy Pro Series driver for Andretti) was also reported to have gotten involved in the fight. It was estimated that there were 15 to 20 people involved in the fight. Despite winning a season-high number of races (5) Kanaan finished 3rd in points, 576 points behind Franchitti and Dixon, who each had 4 wins and more consistent results.

In 2008 Kanaan returned with Andretti Green Racing in the No. 11 7-Eleven Dallara IR5-Honda Indy V8 HI7R. During the season Kanaan's famed 7-Eleven car began to have other companies sponsor the car such as Frank's Energy Drink (Edmonton and Detroit) and Oscar Mayer (Chicagoland). At the season-opening Gainsco Auto Insurance Indy 300 at Homestead-Miami Speedway Kanaan started 6th and led for 35 laps. On lap 193 E. J. Viso spun directly in front of Kanaan and damaged his right-front suspension. Kanaan stayed out hoping the race would finish under caution. On lap 196 the race resumed and Kanaan moved to the inside to allow the faster cars to get by. Kanaan finished 8th, two laps down. At the next race, the Honda Grand Prix of St. Petersburg at Streets of St. Petersburg, Kanaan qualified on the pole position and led for 15 laps. Kanaan eventually finished in 3rd place. Kanaan then had 5th and 2nd-place finishes at the Indy Japan 300 at Twin Ring Motegi and the RoadRunner Turbo Indy 300 at Kansas Speedway. At the Indianapolis 500 Kanaan qualified 6th (the first time Kanaan failed to qualify in the top-5 in his Indianapolis 500 career). On lap 94 Kanaan took the lead for the seventh consecutive year in as many years of competing in the Indianapolis 500. On lap 105 Scott Dixon took the lead and moments later teammate Marco Andretti attempted to pass Kanaan in turn 3 causing Kanaan to lose control of his car and brush the wall. Kanaan then collected the lapped car of Sarah Fisher, taking both out of the race. This would be the first of several incidents between Kanaan and Andretti Green Racing teammates Andretti and Danica Patrick. Kanaan rebounded to get a 3rd-place finish at the ABC Supply Company A. J. Foyt 225 at the Milwaukee Mile and a 5th-place finish at the Bombardier Learjet 550 at Texas Motor Speedway. At the Iowa Corn Indy 250 at Iowa Speedway Kanaan started 4th and led for 71 laps, only to crash after 211 laps. Kanaan dominated the following race, the SunTrust Indy Challenge at Richmond International Raceway, as he qualified on the pole position, set the fastest lap of the race, led for 166 of 300 laps and won his first (and only) win of the 2008 season. Five races later at the Rexall Edmonton Indy at Rexall Speedway Kanaan started from 27th (last) place and finished 9th. In the race, Kanaan had issues with both Andretti and Patrick (ironically the two of them had also made contact during the race). Kanaan rose above the controversy to finish 3rd in points with 513 points. Kanaan also renewed with Andretti Green Racing through the 2013 season.

Kanaan returned with Andretti Green Racing for 2009 in the No. 11 7-Eleven Dallara IR5-Honda Indy V8 HI7R with additional sponsorship from Dr. Pepper, Nestlé Pure Life and Oscar Mayer. At the season-opening Honda Grand Prix of St. Petersburg at Streets of St. Petersburg, Kanaan started 3rd and finished 5th. Kanaan then had 3rd-place finishes at the Toyota Grand Prix of Long Beach on the Streets of Long Beach and the RoadRunner Turbo Indy 300 at Kansas Speedway. Kanaan took the points lead after Kansas (the first time Kanaan led the standings since winning the championship following the 2004 Chevy 500 at Texas Motor Speedway). At the Indianapolis 500 Kanaan qualified in 6th place and the race was running in 3rd place when the driveshaft failed, causing him to lose control of his car due to the steering being incapacitated, hitting the turn 3 wall in an impact that was 175 G's. Kanaan finished in 27th place. The race was the first time that Kanaan failed to lead the Indianapolis 500. Kanaan suffered bruised ribs in the accident. Despite the injuries, Kanaan did not miss any races during the season nor did he need any relief during any race. At the following race, the ABC Supply Company A. J. Foyt 225 at the Milwaukee Mile Kanaan started 3rd and led for 25 laps only to suffer an engine failure after 132 laps, finishing in 18th place. At the Rexall Edmonton Indy at Rexall Speedway Kanaan had a pit fire after completing 34 laps and finished in 21st. Kanaan's best finish after Indianapolis was a 3rd-place finish at the Meijer Indy 300 presented by Red Baron and Edy's at Kentucky Speedway. Kanaan finished 6th in points with 386 points.

In 2010 Kanaan returned to drive the No. 11 7-Eleven Dallara IR5-Honda Indy V8 HI7R with additional sponsorship from Nestlé Pure Life, Dr. Pepper Cherry and Planters. During the off-season Andretti Green Racing was reorganized as Andretti Autosport. Kanaan's best finish in the first five races of the season was a 3rd-place finish at the RoadRunner Turbo Indy 300 at Kansas Speedway. At the Indianapolis 500 Kanaan crashed during his qualifying attempt on Pole Day and in the crash, Kanaan's engine was split into two pieces. Kanaan would have to qualify on Bump Day in a backup car. During practice on Bump Day Kanaan had a nearly identical crash to the Pole Day crash. The team needed to repair the car before the end of the day or Kanaan would fail to qualify for the race. At 5:23 p.m. solidly qualified for the race. Kanaan qualified in 32nd place but moved back to his original(repaired) car and started 33rd. This also meant that Kanaan's record of having always qualified on the first two rows in each of his Indianapolis 500 came to an end. In the race, Kanaan had moved into 25th place when the caution came out for a crash by Davey Hamilton out of turn 2 on the backstretch. Kanaan then moved into 17th place by lap 8 when another caution came out for a crash by Bruno Junqueira. During a pit stop sequence while under caution for a crash by teammate John Andretti Kanaan improved from 12th to 4th place. Kanaan soon moved into 2nd place behind friend Dario Franchitti. In the late stages of the race Mike Conway, Justin Wilson, Hélio Castroneves and Graham Rahal stayed out in an attempt to stretch their fuel mileage to the end of the race with no more pit stops. They all had to pit and Franchitti and Kanaan moved back into 1st and 2nd place on lap 192. On lap 196 Kanaan had to make a pit stop for fuel. This caused Kanaan to drop to an 11th-place finish. Kanaan went on to win the Iowa Corn Indy 250 Presented by Pioneer at Iowa Speedway after starting 15th and leading for 62 laps. Kanaan's next best finish following Indianapolis was a 3rd-place finish at the season-ending Cafés do Brasil Indy 300 at Homestead-Miami Speedway. Kanaan finished 6th in points with 453 points. In October Kanaan was released from his contract with Andretti after sponsor 7-Eleven announced it would not return as Kanaan's primary sponsor in 2011. Kanaan won 14 races and 1 championship in 8 years with Andretti.

Kanaan originally was going to drive for de Ferran Dragon Racing, owned by Kanaan's former competitor and countryman Gil de Ferran. Just days before the season-opening Honda Grand Prix of St. Petersburg on the Streets of St. Petersburg the deal fell through and Kanaan was without a team. Kanaan then began to drive for KV Racing Technology-Lotus, also owned by another of Kanaan's former rivals Jimmy Vasser, in the No. 82 GEICO/Lotus Cars Dallara IR5-Honda Indy V8 HI7R in a car based on the Lotus 38-Ford V8 that Jim Clark drove to win the 1965 Indianapolis 500 (the first rear-engine car to win the race). At St. Petersburg Kanaan finished in 3rd place after having a race-long battle with future teammate Simona de Silvestro. Kanaan followed this result with a 6th and an 8th at the Indy Grand Prix of Alabama at Barber Motorsports Park and the Toyota Grand Prix of Long Beach on the Streets of Long Beach to remain 3rd in points. At the Indianapolis 500 Kanaan started 22nd and in the race, he battled with Scott Dixon and Graham Rahal in the late stages of the race, running as high as 2nd place. Kanaan eventually made a pit stop and finished 4th behind friend Dan Wheldon, J. R. Hildebrand and Rahal. Kanaan started on the pole position at the Firestone Twin 275s Race #2 at Texas Motor Speedway (the starting lineup for the race was determined by a random draw) and in the race Kanaan finished in 5th place. At the Iowa Corn Indy 250 at Iowa Speedway Kanaan battled with teammate Takuma Sato, Marco Andretti, Oriol Servia and Dario Franchitti. Kanaan finished 2nd to former teammate Andretti after Sato crashed, Servia stalled after making a pit stop during the caution for Sato's crash and Franchitti dropped to 5th. Kanaan was involved in a spectacular crash at the MoveThatBlock.com Indy 225 at New Hampshire Motor Speedway with Andretti and Tomas Scheckter that had Kanaan flip down the track's back straightaway and at one he hit a portable toilet located next to the track and finished 22nd. In August it was announced that Kanaan signed on for another year with KV Racing Technology according to team owner Jimmy Vasser.
At the Baltimore Grand Prix on the Streets of Baltimore Kanaan finished 3rd after starting in 27th (last) place due to a crash with Hélio Castroneves when Kanaan got airborne after running over the right side of Castroneves' car when Castroneves was braking. At the season-ending IZOD IndyCar World Championship at Las Vegas Motor Speedway Kanaan qualified on the pole position and led the first 12 laps of the race when it was stopped when Wade Cunningham made contact with James Hinchcliffe in turn 1. Cunningham and Hildebrand then made contact when Cunningham swerved and Hildebrand drove over the rear of his car. Hildebrand's car became airborne and Cunningham collected Jay Howard on the inside and then Townsend Bell on the outside before crashing into the wall. Attempting to avoid the crash ahead, Vítor Meira lost control, spinning inward collecting both Charlie Kimball and E. J. Viso. At the same time, Meira lost control, Scheckter was also attempting to avoid the first crash by rapidly slowing down on the outside. This led to Paul Tracy crashing into the back of Scheckter and a rapidly approaching Pippa Mann to launch over the top of Tracy after jerking to the outside to avoid crashing into Alex Lloyd. Kanaan's friend Wheldon (who started in 34th and last place in an attempt to win the race and collect $5 million from series' sponsors Verizon Wireless and GoDaddy.com to split evenly with a random fan) was running in 24th place and had slowed down from 220 miles per hour to 165 miles per hour when he ran over the rear end of Kimball's car and went airborne. Wheldon was pronounced dead on arrival at University Medical Center of Southern Nevada at 1:54 p.m. of blunt force trauma. The race was immediately canceled and removed from the record books. The cars that survived the accident (except for Alex Tagliani, who was driving the same car that Wheldon used to win the Indianapolis 500) drove five laps around the track in three-abreast style, similar to the style used at the Indianapolis 500 as a tribute to Wheldon. The American ABC broadcast showed Kanaan and Dario Franchitti (friend of Kanaan and Wheldon) crying due to Wheldon's death during the five laps. Kanaan finished out the season ranked fifth in points with 366 points.

Kanaan returned with KV Racing Technology in 2012 to drive the No. 11 GEICO/Mouser Electronics-sponsored Dallara DW12-Ilmor-Chevrolet Indy V6. The Dallara DW12 was named after Dan Wheldon, who had tested the car (then known as the Dallara IR12) at Mid-Ohio Sports Car Course and the Indianapolis Motor Speedway. Kanaan's close friend Rubens Barrichello joined the team for his first season in the IndyCar Series. Kanaan started off the season with 25th and 21st-place finishes at the Honda Grand Prix of St. Petersburg on the Streets of St. Petersburg and the Honda Indy Grand Prix of Alabama at Barber Motorsports Park. Kanaan then finished 4th at the Toyota Grand Prix of Long Beach on the Streets of Long Beach. At the Indianapolis 500 Kanaan qualified in 8th place (Kanaan's best start in the race since a 6th place start in 2009). In the race, Kanaan led for 7 laps in the late stages of the race (the first time Kanaan led the race since 2008). On lap 194 Kanaan was passed by Dario Franchitti, Scott Dixon and Takuma Sato. Kanaan finished in 3rd place after eventual winner Franchitti and Sato made contact, causing Sato to crash into the turn 1 wall. This was Kanaan's best finish in the race since a 2nd-place finish in 2004. Kanaan later had a 2nd-place finish at the Milwaukee IndyFest Presented by XYQ at the Milwaukee Mile and a 3rd-place finish at the Iowa Corn Indy 250 at Iowa Speedway. The results at Indianapolis, Milwaukee, and Iowa, along with an 11th-place finish at the Firestone 550 at Texas Motor Speedway made Kanaan challenge for the A. J. Foyt Oval Championship with Ryan Hunter-Reay. Kanaan would also get a 4th-place finish at the Honda Indy Toronto at Exhibition Place. At the season-ending MAVTV 500 IndyCar World Championships at Auto Club Speedway Kanaan and Hunter-Reay were the only drivers who could win the oval championship. In the race, Kanaan qualified 3rd and led for 47 laps while Hunter-Reay (who was battling Will Power for the series championship) was racing conservatively to finish in 5th place or better to win the championship. On lap 241 of 250 Kanaan crashed in turn 4 and finished in 18th place. Hunter-Reay finished in 4th place and won both the series championship and the oval championship. Kanaan finished 9th in the overall standings with 351 points. Kanaan also finished 2nd in the oval standings with 148 points (Hunter-Reay had 168 points).

In 2013 Kanaan returned with KV Racing Technology in the No. 11 Hydroxycut Dallara DW12-Ilmor-Chevrolet Indy V6 with SH Racing joining the team as a partner on Kanaan's car. Hydroxycut announced that they would not sponsor the car at all the races. This meant that the team would have to find additional sponsorship for the remaining races. Mouser Electronics sponsored the car at the Honda Indy Grand Prix of Alabama at Barber Motorsports Park and Itaipava at the Itaipava São Paulo Indy 300 presented by Nestlé on the Streets of São Paulo. Kanaan's best finish in the first four races was a 4th-place finish at the season-opening Honda Grand Prix of St. Petersburg on the Streets of St. Petersburg. At the Indianapolis 500 Kanaan qualified in 12th place. In the race Kanaan quickly moved up through the field and was battling for the lead with Ed Carpenter, Ryan Hunter-Reay and Marco Andretti. On lap 197 Kanaan passed Hunter-Reay for the lead on a restart for a crash by Graham Rahal with the Andretti Autosport cars of Carlos Muñoz, Hunter-Reay and Andretti right behind Kanaan. Moments after Kanaan took the lead Kanaan's friend Dario Franchitti crashed in turn 1, causing the race to finish under caution for the fourth consecutive year. Kanaan won the race at an average speed of 187.433 miles per hour, breaking the record set by Arie Luyendyk in the 1990 race. The race also broke the record for the number of lead changes in the race with 68, breaking the previous record of 34 during the 2012 race. The race meant that the friends of Franchitti (2010), Dan Wheldon (2011), Franchitti (2012) and Kanaan (2013) would have their faces in consecutive positions on the Borg-Warner Trophy. Kanaan later said "I was known for not winning and now I am known for winning. The last lap was the longest lap of my life. I get to put my ugly face on that trophy." It was his first IndyCar Series victory since his split from Andretti Autosport and the first IndyCar Series victory for KV Racing Technology. Kanaan tied Sam Hanks in being the most experienced driver in the Indianapolis 500 driver to win, both doing so in their twelfth start. After his Indianapolis 500 victory Kanaan gained sponsorship from Hippino.com at both rounds of the Chevrolet Detroit Belle Isle Grand Prix at Belle Isle State Park, starting 19th in each race and finishing 13th in race No. 1 and 12th in race No. 2. The team also gained sponsorship from Sunoco (the official fuel provider for the series) and also gained sponsorship to the Indianapolis 500 film Turbo. The reason for the latter sponsorship was due to Sunoco having an endorsement for the film from producer DreamWorks Animation and distributor 20th Century Fox Film Corporation. In his first race with the sponsorship, the Firestone 550 at Texas Motor Speedway, Kanaan started 13th and finished 3rd. Kanaan then managed to finish 3rd at the Iowa Corn Indy 250 Presented by DEKALB at Iowa Speedway after starting 5th. Kanaan attempted to win the second leg of the Fuzzy's Triple Crown, the Pocono IndyCar 400 fueled by Sunoco at Pocono Raceway. In the race, Kanaan qualified in 5th place and led for 15 laps, and was battling with Scott Dixon for the win. When Kanaan attempted to pass Dixon the right side of Kanaan's front wing hit the left rear of Dixon's car, damaging Kanaaan's wing and causing him to have to make a green-flag pit stop. Dixon went on to win the race while Kanaan finished in 13th place, the last car to finish on the lead lap. Following his Indianapolis win and several other respectable results, Kanaan found himself in the top 5 in points. Kanaan's season began to have several disappointing results starting at the Honda Indy Toronto twin races at Exhibition Place. In race No. 1 Kanaan started in 4th place and finished 5th. In race No. 2 Kanaan started 6th and crashed after 35 laps to finish in 24th (last) place. Following the second Toronto race, Kanaan dropped from 5th to 6th in points. At the next race of the season, the Honda Indy 200 at Mid-Ohio at the Mid-Ohio Sports Car Course Kanaan started 19th and finished 24th (last) for the second consecutive race due to a loose wheel after 64 laps. At the next race, the GoPro Indy Grand Prix of Sonoma at Sonoma Raceway Kanaan tied with his then-team owner Jimmy Vasser for the all-time IndyCar Series (including the AAA Contest Board, the USAC National Championship and the Champ Car World Series) record for most consecutive starts with 211, dating back to the 2001 Freightliner/G.I. Joes 200 Presented by Texaco at Portland International Raceway. In the race Kanaan started 16th and finished 13th. Following the race, Kanaan dropped from 10th to 11th in points. Kanaan would get a third 24th (last) place finish in six races at the Shell and Pennzoil Grand Prix of Houston at Reliant Park. Around this time on 27 September Kanaan was announced as the driver of the No. 8 NTT Data/TNT Energy Drink Dallara DW12-Ilmor-Chevrolet Indy V6 for NTT Data Chip Ganassi Racing in 2014. At the season-ending MAVTV 500 IndyCar World Championships at Auto Club Speedway Kanaan started 9th and led for 3 laps. Kanaan finished in 3rd place behind Will Power and Carpenter. The race was also notable for being the first race to not have Franchitti, due to his injuries at the Shell and Pennzoil Grand Prix of Houston at Reliant Park after making contact with Takuma Sato and flipping into the catch fence in a crash similar to Wheldon's fatal accident, since the 2008 Peak Antifreeze Indy 300 at Chicagoland Speedway (at that race it was due to Franchitti participating in the NASCAR Cup Series that year). Following the race, Kanaan and 2nd-place finisher Carpenter wished Franchitti a recovery when the two were being interviewed on the broadcast by the NBC Sports Network. Kanaan finished 11th in points with 397 points, making it the first full-time season in the IndyCar Series that Kanaan failed to finish in the top 10 in points (Kanaan did finish 50th in points in 2002 due to only running the Indianapolis 500). On a positive note, Kanaan won the series' Most Popular Driver award.

Dario Franchitti's injuries were enough for him to announce his retirement from racing. This meant that his car at Target Chip Ganassi Racing (the team that had won the series championship each year from 2008 to 2013, except 2012, with Franchitti and Scott Dixon) needed a replacement driver. Ryan Briscoe, Alex Tagliani (who drove in Franchitti's place at Fontana and also did off season testing in the car), Sergio Pérez, Sam Hornish Jr., Oriol Servia, Justin Wilson and Franchitti's cousin Paul di Resta were all considered for the car at some point. Kanaan was eventually named to drive the car with Briscoe moving into the car originally intended for Kanaan (Briscoe had previously driven the car at the 2013 Indianapolis 500). In 2014 Kanaan drove the No. 10 Target Dallara DW12-Ilmor-Chevrolet Indy V6 with additional sponsorship from GE Reveal, Lexar, Energizer, Suave Professionals for Men, TNT Energy Drink, Glad and Huggies. At the season-opening Firestone Grand Prix of St. Petersburg on the Streets of St. Petersburg, Kanaan started in 2nd place and finished in 6th place. Over the next five races, Kanaan's best start was a 9th at the Grand Prix of Indianapolis on the Indianapolis Motor Speedway road course and his best finish in these races was a 9th place at the Honda Indy Grand Prix of Alabama at Barber Motorsports Park after starting from 23rd (last) place. At the Indianapolis 500 Kanaan qualified in a disappointing 16th place in a forgettable Indianapolis 500 for Chip Ganassi Racing that had teammates Scott Dixon qualify 11th (he had the 3rd fastest speed in the field but had to start in the position due to not being fast enough to qualify for the Firestone Fast Nine after the first qualifying day), Charlie Kimball qualify 26th, Briscoe qualify 30th and Sage Karam (in a car co-owned by both Dreyer & Reinbold Racing and Kingdom Racing) qualify 31st. On Carb Day practice (the final practice before the race) Kanaan and Dixon had the two fastest speeds for the session at 227.383 and 227.773 miles per hour each. In the race Kanaan was moving up through the field with various other cars who were quick but had a poor starting position, such as Ryan Hunter-Reay and Townsend Bell. On lap 66 Kanaan ran out of fuel but managed to make it back to his pit stall. The pit stop took 43 seconds and dropped Kanaan down the running order. On lap 73 Kanaan returned to the pit lane with a broken starter. Kanaan's crew managed to repair the car, but Kanaan went down 18 laps and was out of contention for the rest of the race. Kanaan would eventually finish in 26th place with 177 laps complete (23 laps down). The finishing results were also a disappointment for the rest of Chip Ganassi Racing with Briscoe finishing 18th with all 200 laps complete after being nearly taken out in a crash in turn 2 of the first lap, Dixon finished 29th due to a crash on lap 168 and Kimball finished 31st due to a crash on lap 150 (the race had been caution-free to that point). The only positive for the team was rookie Karam having a respectable race to finish in 9th place. At the next race of the season, the Chevrolet Detroit Belle Isle Grand Prix Race #1 at Belle Isle State Park, Kanaan managed to finish in 3rd place after starting in 8th place. In the second race, Kanaan managed to get a 9th-place finish. At the following race, the Firestone 600 at Texas Motor Speedway, Kanaan started in 3rd place, and on lap 242 of 248 the caution came out for an engine fire on Takuma Sato's car. By that point in the race there were only six cars on the lead lap: Ed Carpenter, Juan Pablo Montoya, Simon Pagenaud, Dixon, Kanaan, and Will Power. All of the drivers, except leader Carpenter and 2nd place Montoya, pitted for new tires. On lap 246 the race was restarted and Kanaan finished 6th. Kanaan was poised to finish in 3rd place at the next race, the Shell and Pennzoil Grand Prix of Houston Race #1 at NRG Park when on the next-to-last lap Graham Rahal in 4th place rear-ended Kanaan's car, dropping him to a 13th-place finish, Rahal was penalized from 3rd place to 11th place. Kanaan finished in 10th place after starting 8th in the second race. At the next race, the Pocono IndyCar 500 at Pocono Raceway, Kanaan started in 8th place and led for a race-high 78 of 200 laps after battling with Team Penske teammates Montoya, Power and Hélio Castroneves. Kanaan's team then put Kanaan on a different strategy than the rest of the leaders that would only work if a caution came out late in the race. The race only had six laps of caution due to a single-car crash by Rahal on lap 159. Kanaan and Josef Newgarden, who was attempting the same strategy after struggling for most of the race, had to pit on laps 196 and 194. This resulted in an 11th-place finish with Newgarden in 10th. At the following race, the Iowa Corn Indy 300 at Iowa Speedway Kanaan started in 2nd place to teammate Dixon. In the race, Kanaan led for 247 of 300 laps and it looked as if Kanaan would get his first victory of the season when on lap 282 the caution came out for a crash by Montoya. During the caution, the cars of Carpenter, Hunter-Reay, Rahal, and Newgarden all made pit stops for fresh tires. On the restart, on lap 291 Hunter-Reay and Newgarden quickly moved up through the field with Hunter-Reay taking the lead on lap 299. Kanaan would also lose 2nd place to Newgarden. At the next race, the Honda Indy Toronto Race #1 at Exhibition Place Kanaan started in 5th place and finished in 3rd place. In the second race, Kanaan started from 9th place (the starting lineup was determined by drivers points following the first race) and nearly won his first race of the season. On lap 51 a crash occurred that involved several cars and the race was immediately stopped. The race was also a timed race with approximately 4:00 minutes left in the race Kanaan was in 3rd place behind Mike Conway, who had older slick tires, and Wilson, who had older rain tires. On the restart, Kanaan was held up by the slower car of Wilson along with several lapped cars. Kanaan would eventually finish in 2nd place, his best finish since winning the 2013 Indianapolis 500. At the following race, the Honda Indy 200 at Mid-Ohio at Mid-Ohio Sports Car Course, Kanaan started in 3rd place and crashed out on the first lap of the race and collected Marco Andretti. Kanaan finished the race in 21st place. At the ABC Supply Wisconsin 250 at Milwaukee IndyFest Presented by the Metro Milwaukee Honda Dealers at the Milwaukee Mile. Kanaan started in 2nd place and finished in 3rd place after leading for 14 laps. At the following race, the GoPro Grand Prix of Sonoma at Sonoma Raceway, Kanaan started in 8th place and finished in 13th place. At the season-ending MAVTV 500 IndyCar World Championships at Auto Club Speedway Kanaan started in 7th place. Kanaan led for 64 laps, including the final 54 laps, to win his first race since the 2013 Indianapolis 500. Kanaan finished 7th in points with 544 points. This was the highest position that Kanaan finished in the final point standings since the 2011 season.

In 2015 Kanaan began to drive the No. 10 NTT Data Chevy for Ganassi due to Target focusing only on Scott Dixon.
In 2017 Kanaan would have his worst and last season in the No.10 NNT Data Chevy for Ganassi, He would lose the ride at the end of the Year.
In 2018 Tony Kanaan would begin the year with a new ride in the No.14 ABC Supply Chevy for A. J. Foyt Racing he would team up with Rookie Matheus Leist who drove the No.4 ABC Supply Chevy for A. J. Foyt Racing. In 2018 and 2019 Tony Kanaan would finish no better than 15th in the standing. Tony Kanaan entered the 2020 season stating it would be his last, running only a five-race schedule at the oval tracks. He shared the No.14 ABC Supply Chevy with other drivers who ran it at the street & road courses. In 2021 he returned to Chip Ganassi Racing on a partial schedule, driving the No. 48 Dallara Honda on oval courses. Seven-time NASCAR series champion Jimmie Johnson shared the No. 48, driving it on the road and street courses.

Sports car racing

United States Road Racing Championship
Kanaan competed in the Sports Car Club of America United States Road Racing Championship in 1998. Kanaan would only compete at the Rolex 24 at Daytona, the largest sports car race in terms of prestige in the United States. Kanaan would drive the No. 4 Tom Gloy Racing Ford Mustang Cobra with Mike Borkowski and Robbie Buhl. Kanaan's car owner was a former Indy car driver and sports car champion in Tom Gloy. The team would participate in the GT1 class. The car would start in 5th place and finish in 3rd place after completing 624 laps due to a mechanical problem. Kanaan would finish 19th in points in the GT1 class with 35 points in a tie with teammates Borkowski and Buhl.

American Le Mans Series
Kanaan would begin to compete in the American Le Mans Series in 2007 in the No. 26 XM Satellite Radio Acura Courage ARX-01a-Acura AL7R 3.4L V8 for Andretti Green Racing in the LMP2 class. Bryan Herta and Dario Franchitti would co-drive with Kanaan at the season-opening Mobil 1 12 Hours of Sebring, the series' most prestigious race, the car started 4th in class and win in the class. The car would finish 2nd overall. Kanaan would then return at the Petit Le Mans at Road Atlanta in the same car with Herta and Vítor Meira. The car would start 4th in class and finish 9th due to a crash after 50 laps. The car would finish 28th in the overall results. Kanaan then drove at the next race, the season-ending Monterey Sports Car Championships at Mazda Raceway Laguna Seca. Kanaan would co-drive with Herta. The car would start 3rd in class and finish 4th with all 357 laps complete. The car would finish 6th overall. Kanaan would finish 17th in points with 39 points in the LMP2 standings. The team would finish 5th in the LMP2 standings with 98 points.

Kanaan would return in 2008 in the No. 26 XM Satellite Radio Acura ARX-01b-Acura AL7R 3.4 L V8 for Andretti Green Racing. Kanaan would first drive at the Petit Le Mans powered by the New Mazda6 at Road Atlanta in the LMP2 class with Franck Montagny and Marco Andretti. The car would start in 4th place in its class and finish in 7th place due to a crash after 347 laps. The car would finish 16th overall. Kanaan would also drive at the next race of the season, the season-ending Monterey Sports Car Championships presented by Patrón at Mazda Raceway Laguna Seca, with Montagny. The car would start 5th in its class and would win the race. The car would finish 3rd overall. Kanaan would finish 22nd in the LMP2 standings in a tie with fellow Andretti driver James Rossiter. The car would finish 4th in the LMP2 standings with 128 points.

Rolex Grand-Am Sports Car Series
Kanaan would begin to compete in the Rolex Grand-Am Sports Car Series in 2013. At the season-opening Rolex 24 at Daytona, the largest sports car race in the United States in terms of prestige. Kanaan would drive the No. 21 Porsche GT3 Cup Challenge Brazil Porsche 911 GT3 Cup-Porsche 4.0L F6 for Dener Motorsport in the GT class. Kanaan would co-drive in an all-Brazilian driver-lineup with Rubens Barrichello, Nonô Figueiredo, Felipe Giaffone and Ricardo Mauricio. The car would start 25th and would finish 28th with 352 laps complete. Kanaan returned later in the season for the Brickyard Grand Prix on the Indianapolis Motor Speedway road course in the No. 02 NTT Data Riley Mk. XXVI-BMW 5.0L V8 owned by Chip Ganassi Racing with Felix Sabates in the DP class with Joey Hand. The car would start 10th and finish 9th with 106 laps complete. Kanaan would finish 58th in the DP standings with 22 points and 138th in the GT standings with 16 points.

Tudor United SportsCar Championship
After 2013 Grand-Am and ALMS merged to form the Tudor United SportsCar Championship sanctioned by the International Motor Sports Association. Kanaan would begin to compete in the new series for Chip Ganassi Racing with Felix Sabates in the No. 02 Riley MkXXVI-Ford EcoBoost 3.5L Turbo V6 in the P class. Kanaan first drove at the Rolex 24 at Daytona with sponsorship from Telcel and Target and co-drivers Scott Dixon, Kyle Larson and Marino Franchitti. The car would start 5th in its class and finish 8th after retiring after completing 667 laps. Kanaan then competed in the next race of the season, the Mobil 1 12 Hours of Sebring fueled by Fresh from Florida in the same car. This would be the first time that Kanaan competed in both of the United States' major sports car races, the 24 Hours of Daytona and 12 Hours of Sebring. At Sebring Kanaan had sponsorship from Big Machine Records and Comfort Revolution and co-drivers Dixon and Karam. The car would start and finish 6th in its class. The car would also manage to finish 6th overall in a race that had the top 9 finishing positions come from cars that were a part of the P class. Following the Brickyard Grand Prix on the Indianapolis Motor Speedway road course Kanaan is 38th in points with 50 points in the P class while the car is 14th in points with 50 points in the P class.

24 Hours of Le Mans
Kanaan made his 24 Hours of Le Mans debut at the 2017 edition, replacing the injured Sébastien Bourdais in the #68 Ford Chip Ganassi Team USA Ford GT

Formula Nippon

Kanaan would compete in Formula Nippon in 2007 for Kanaan Racing in the No. 27 Bridgestone Potenza Lola FN06-Mugen Honda HF386E. Kanaan would only compete in the season-ending race at the Suzuka Circuit as a special entrant under the authorization of JAF. Kanaan would finish the race in 6th place. Kanaan would finish in 22nd place in points with no points.

Prelude to the Dream
In 2010 Tony Stewart, champion in both the IndyCar Series and NASCAR Cup Series (the only driver to win the championship in both) and owner of Eldora Speedway, offered the driver who won the 2010 Indianapolis 500 a chance to drive in his charity race, the Prelude to the Dream at Eldora Speedway Kanaan would participate in the race after Indianapolis 500 winner Dario Franchitti decided not to compete in the race. Kanaan accepted and drove the No. 11 7-Eleven Cadillac for GRT Race Cars in a car based on his Andretti Autosport car from 2003 to 2010. The race would have drivers competing on teams each representing a different children's hospital being benefitted from the race. Kanaan would be a part of Team St. Jude, representing the St. Jude Children's Research Hospital. The other hospitals were the James Whitcomb Riley Hospital for Children, the Cincinnati Children's Hospital Medical Center, and the Levine Children's Hospital. Also on Kanaan's team were team captain Denny Hamlin and Carl Edwards from the NASCAR Cup Series, Ken Schrader, Aric Almirola, and Ricky Carmichael from the NASCAR Camping World Truck Series and former NASCAR crew chief and car owner Ray Evernham. Kanaan would qualify 26th out of 27 cars and would finish 24th, three laps down. Jimmie Johnson won the race for Team Levine. Bowyer would finish in 2nd place and would be the highest finisher from Kanaan's team. The race was likely the first race that Kanaan participated in on a dirt track.

Kanaan returned in 2011 with GRT Race Cars in the No. 82 GEICO/Lotus Cars/Honda Honda in a car based on Kanaan's No. 82 GEICO/Lotus Cars Dallara IR07-Ilmor-Honda Indy V8 owned by KV Racing Technology-Lotus from 2011 (the original Indy car was itself based on the Lotus 38-Ford V8 that Jim Clark used to win the 1965 Indianapolis 500). Kanaan would be a part of Team Dallas representing the Children's Medical Center. The other hospitals represented were the Levine Children's Hospital, the Children's Healthcare of Atlanta and the St. Louis Children's Hospital. Also on the team were Tony Stewart, Matt Kenseth, Brian Vickers, Marcos Ambrose and J. J. Yeley from the NASCAR Cup Series and Aric Almirola from the NASCAR Nationwide Series. Kanaan would start 15th out of 28 cars and would finish 27th due to a loose wheel after 18 of 30 laps. Clint Bowyer would win the race for Team Atlanta. Yeley would finish in 2nd place as the high finishing driver on Kanaan's team.

In 2012 Kanaan returned to drive the No. 11 GEICO/Mouser Electronics/Itaipava/Braskem Chevrolet for GRT Race Cars in a car based on the No. 11 GEICO/Mouser Electronics Dallara DW12-Ilmor-Chevrolet Indy V6 owned by KV Racing Technology in 2012. For 2012 each driver was not part of a larger team. In the race, Kanaan started 17th of 26 cars and would finish 22nd due to a mechanical problem on the second lap.

Touring car and stock car racing

International Touring Car Championship
In 1996, Kanaan drove a Opel Calibra at the Interlagos round of the International Touring Car Championship.

Stock Car Brasil
In 2012 Kanaan began to compete in Stock Car Brasil in the No. 100 Bassani Racing Peugeot 408. Kanaan first competed at the race at Autódromo Internacional Nelson Piquet. In the race, Kanaan finished in 19th place. Kanaan then raced at the next race, the season-ending Stock Car Corrida do Milhão at Autódromo José Carlos Pace. Kanaan started in 26th place and finish in 31st place due to retiring after 8 laps. Kanaan was ineligible to score points towards the championship and as a result, Kanaan went unranked in the final championship standings.

The driver raced full-time in the 2021 season, driving a Toyota Corolla for Full Time Bassani. He had a best finish of 12th at round 4 at Interlagos.

NASCAR Xfinity Series
When Kanaan was in the process of leaving KV Racing Technology Kanaan had an offer from NASCAR team Joe Gibbs Racing to first drive in the NASCAR Xfinity Series and later the NASCAR Cup Series. During this time Kanaan wanted to remain in the IndyCar Series and negotiated with KV, Chip Ganassi Racing, Andretti Autosport and Bryan Herta Autosport for IndyCar. Kanaan stated that each team needed Kanaan to bring sponsorship to the team. Before the Federated Auto Parts 400 at Richmond International Raceway J.D. Gibbs stated that Kanaan was "It's way too early to even talk about that [possibility of driving for JGR]. Listen, guys, we just had a meeting, and I don't know when we'll talk to him again. If all it takes is a helmet and personality to get a ride with us [as some have suggested], I'd still be driving. And if I had $8 million [to sponsor a Nationwide team] I'd still have a ride. But he's a really neat guy and he'd be better than me." Had Kanaan joined Gibbs he would have likely driven the No. 20 Dollar General Toyota Camry in the NASCAR Xfinity Series in place of Brian Vickers who would begin to drive full-time for Michael Waltrip Racing in 2014. Kanaan eventually got a team in INDYCAR with NTT Data Chip Ganassi Racing and was later switched to Target Chip Ganassi Racing.

Superstar Racing Experience
In 2021, Kanaan entered four races of the Superstar Racing Experience, an all-star stock car racing series. His best results were 7th at Stafford and Eldora.

Indianapolis 500 history

Kanaan arrived at Indianapolis as a rookie in 2002, and despite being one of the top drivers on the IndyCar circuit, experienced a notable streak of bad luck for eleven seasons until finally winning the race in 2013. Kanaan won the pole position in 2005, finished second in 2004, and also broke a historical race record by leading at least one lap in his first seven starts. Despite being competitive in most years, numerous near-misses, unfortunate crashes, and his status as a fan-favorite driver, made his 2013 long-awaited triumph a popular victory.

2002: In his rookie year, Kanaan led 23 laps and was leading the race on lap 90, when Jimmy Vasser and Bruno Junqueira both slowed with mechanical problems. An oil leak on the racing line went unnoticed, and Kanaan spun in the oil, crashing out of the lead in turn 3. One year earlier in 2001, Kanaan's friend and former Indy Lights teammate at Tasman Motorsports, Hélio Castroneves, won the race as a rookie. In 2002, Castroneves repeated, winning the race back-to-back.
2003: Kanaan started 2nd, and finished 3rd. He led 2 laps but was no match for the Team Penske cars, who finished 1st and 2nd.
2004: Kanaan ran among the leaders all day and led 28 laps. Rain halted the race 20 laps short of the finish, and Kanaan managed to finish only 2nd place.
2005: Kanaan won his first Indianapolis 500 pole position, and led 54 laps. Kanaan was not a factor in the final 50 laps and dropped to 8th place at the finish. Kanaan's Andretti Green Racing teammate and friend Dan Wheldon won the race.
2006: Pit stop shuffling in the final 20 laps caused Kanaan to inherit the lead on lap 183. Kanaan needed one final splash-and-go pit stop, but a caution came out on lap 191. Kanaan made his stop under yellow, and the sequence saw him lose the lead. Running 4th, Kanaan was blocked inadvertently by teammate and team owner Michael Andretti and lost momentum. On the final lap Wheldon slipped by to take 4th, and Kanaan finished 5th.
2007: Kanaan was leading the race just beyond the halfway point when rain brought out the red flag on lap 113. If the rain continued, Kanaan could have been declared the winner, since the race had passed the point in which it had become official. The rain stopped, and the race was resumed. Kanaan continued to lead, and the leaders pit under caution on lap 151. During the restart on lap 156, Kanaan came up on the back of Jaques Lazier and lost control. Kanaan then spun into the entrance of the pits, blowing a tire. An angry Kanaan was credited with 12th place, while his Andretti Green Racing teammate and friend Dario Franchitti won the race.
2008: On lap 94, Kanaan set an all-time Indianapolis 500 record by leading at least one lap in his first seven consecutive starts. The lead was short-lived, however. On lap 105, Marco Andretti was trying to pass Kanaan in turn 3, which sent Kanaan into the marbles. Kanaan lost control, crashed into the outside wall, then collected the car of Sarah Fisher.
2009: On lap 98, while running in 3rd place Kanaan suffered a driveshaft failure at speed down the back straightaway. The car suddenly pitched into the wall at the entrance to turn 3. The car lost steering, bounced off the wall, then went straight into the wall in turn 3. In television interviews, Kanaan appeared visibly shaken. The next day Kanaan stated the hit was recorded at 175 Gs.
2010: On the morning of pole day, Kanaan spun out of turn 1, and wrecked hard in the south short chute. The crash prevented Kanaan from making a qualifying attempt on Saturday. The following day (Bump Day), Kanaan was practicing in his backup car, when he suffered another, nearly identical crash, in the same part of the track. The second crash put in question Kanaan's chances of qualifying and set the team and driver back a considerable amount of time and effort. Kanaan finally managed to qualify and started the race from the final row in 33rd place. On race day, Kanaan charged to the front and ran as high as second in the last ten laps of the race. Kanaan nearly matched Tom Sneva's 1980 record of being the only driver to start last (33rd) and lead a lap. A fuel strategy gamble failed, and Kanaan was forced to make one final splash-and-go pit stop with four laps to go. The pit stop dropped him to 11th in the final results. Kanaan garnered much praise from the fans and media for the accomplishment.
2011: Kanaan was released by Andretti Autosport. Kanaan began to drive for driving for KV Racing Technology-Lotus. Kanaan qualified 22nd and worked his way up to 4th by lap 60. In the pit lane on lap 61, Kanaan was involved in a mishap with Pippa Mann. Mann was pulling out of her pit box as he was trying to pull in his, and he was forced to overshoot his pit stall. After being pushed back and receiving service, he dropped down to 24th place. He charged dramatically back up to 2nd place by lap 178. He pitted for fuel with 21 laps to go, which dropped him to an eventual 4th-place finish. Kanaan later stated he felt he did not have a car fast enough to win.
2012: On a restart on lap 186, Kanaan made a bold move going from 5th to 1st into turn 1, and led for 7 laps. With less than six laps to go Kanaan was passed for the lead on lap 194 and finished 3rd.
2013: In the fastest and most competitive Indianapolis 500 in history (a record 68 lead changes), Kanaan slipped in front of Ryan Hunter-Reay in turn 1 on a lap 198 restart. Dario Franchitti crashed a few seconds afterward, and the race went under caution again, securing Kanaan his first Indianapolis 500 victory.
2014: Kanaan left KV Racing Technology to drive for Target Chip Ganassi Racing. Kanaan only led the 31st lap of the race after starting on the inside of the sixth row (16th). Kanaan's chances of a repeat win ended when he ran out of fuel on lap 66 and coasted into the pits. He returned to the track after a 43-second stop but was back in soon after with a broken starter which lost him 18 laps while repairs were made. Kanaan finished 26th, 23 laps down on winner Ryan Hunter-Reay.

Personal life
Kanaan is of Lebanese ancestry. Kanaan is a member of the "brat pack", a group of CART drivers that were close friends off the track, that included Dario Franchitti, Max Papis and the late Greg Moore.

Kanaan is an avid triathlete. He credits triathlon training for his ability to stay in shape for driving. Kanaan has completed numerous half Ironman competitions (1.2-mile swim/56-mile bike/13.1-mile run) and competed in the Ironman World Championships (2.4-mile swim/112-mile bike/26.2-mile run) in 2011 with a time of 12:52:40. Kanaan has been married twice and has four children.

Media appearances

Film and television
Kanaan appears in the 2001 film Driven as himself in a scene where several drivers prepare for the final race of the season (and film) at Detroit (likely Belle Isle State Park). The racing series used for the film is the FedEx CART Championship Series, which Kanaan raced in at the time for Mo Nunn Racing.

The first episode of the television series IndyCar 36 was about Kanaan's weekend leading up to the 2012 Honda Grand Prix of St. Petersburg on the Streets of St. Petersburg. The episode was aired on 1 April 2012 before the Honda Indy Grand Prix of Alabama at Barber Motorsports Park.

Kanaan has also appeared in Celebrity Family Feud alongside several other drivers

Racing record

American open–wheel racing results
(key)

Indy Lights presented by Cooper Tires

CART World Series

IndyCar Series
(key)

1 Run on same day.
2 The Las Vegas Indy 300 was abandoned after Dan Wheldon died from injuries sustained in a 15-car crash on lap 11.

Indianapolis 500

* Kanaan qualified 32nd in a backup car but decided to switch back to his primary car for the race.  This forced him to start from the 33rd position on the grid.

24 Hours of Daytona results

Complete American Le Mans Series results

Complete Formula Nippon results

† Ineligible for championship points.

Complete Stock Car Brasil results
(key) (Races in bold indicate pole position) (Races in italics indicate fastest lap)

† Driver ineligible for championship points.

Complete IMSA SportsCar Championship results
(key) (Races in bold indicate pole position) (Races in italics indicate fastest lap)

24 Hours of Le Mans results

Complete FIA World Endurance Championship results
(key) (Races in bold indicate pole position; races in italics'' indicate fastest lap)

Superstar Racing Experience
(key) * – Most laps led. 1 – Heat 1 winner. 2 – Heat 2 winner.

 Season still in progress
 Shared points with Hailie Deegan

Notes

References

External links

 
 IndyCar Driver Page
 IndyCar 36: Tony Kanaan – IndyCar documentary

1974 births
Living people
Brazilian racing drivers
Lebanese racing drivers
Brazilian Champ Car drivers
IndyCar Series champions
IndyCar Series drivers
Indianapolis 500 drivers
Indianapolis 500 polesitters
Indy Lights champions
Indy Lights drivers
Formula Nippon drivers
Italian Formula Three Championship drivers
EFDA Nations Cup drivers
Stock Car Brasil drivers
Brazilian people of Lebanese descent
Brazilian IndyCar Series drivers
Brazilian people of Arab descent
Sportspeople from Salvador, Bahia
American Le Mans Series drivers
Brazilian expatriate sportspeople in the United States
24 Hours of Daytona drivers
Rolex Sports Car Series drivers
Indianapolis 500 winners
Brazilian WeatherTech SportsCar Championship drivers
24 Hours of Le Mans drivers
American Ninja Warrior contestants
Sportspeople of Lebanese descent
Cram Competition drivers
Tasman Motorsports drivers
Forsythe Racing drivers
Mo Nunn Racing drivers
Andretti Autosport drivers
KV Racing Technology drivers
Chip Ganassi Racing drivers
A. J. Foyt Enterprises drivers
Multimatic Motorsports drivers
Team Joest drivers
Arrow McLaren SP drivers